Josef Černý (born 1943 in Prague) is a Czech painter. His paintings often have a musical or rural theme. His paintings are in private collections in the Czech Republic and abroad (Germany, France, Sweden, USA, Australia, etc.)

See also
List of Czech painters

References

Czech painters
Czech male painters
1943 births
Living people
Artists from Prague